AROH Foundation is an Indian national-level non-governmental organization founded in 2001 by Neelam Gupta. It is an organization working for underprivileged communities through sustainable development. AROH Foundation's prime focus is in the fields of education, health, sanitation, livelihood, natural resource management, and renewable energy.

Mission 
To provide effective assistance to the underprivileged, weak, and poor people and communities, especially women, in rural and semi-rural areas and slums by way of developing their life skills, economic skills, and socio-cultural skills and making them self-reliant. AROH’s overarching mission is to create an equitable society where all human beings coexist with dignity.

Vision 
AROH seeks a world where people live in dignity and security and there are equal opportunities for all. The vision is for the empowerment of the underprivileged and deprived communities and to see that their development creates a productive force for the process of national development.

Work 
AROH Foundation has been working towards the cause of socio–the economic upliftment of the poor since its inception in the year 2001. AROH has been working on various innovative and sustainable initiatives toward Women's Empowerment Holistic Rural Development Skill & Livelihood Generation, Health & Sanitation and Water & Natural Resource Management in 18 states of India. By far AROH has positively impacted the lives of more than 5 lakh people including more than 2.5 lakh women, and more than 50,000 children in the past 20 years.

Awards 
Working towards all 17 sustainable development goals · AROH has been awarded at many national and international awards including the United Nations Global Compact India.  AROH Foundation was conferred with the ‘Mahatma Award for Social Good 21’.

AROH Foundation was conferred with the United Nations Global Compact Network India’s ‘Innovative Practices Award 2019.

ASSOCHAM conferred the Best NGO Award to the AROH Foundation. The perseverance of Dr. Neelam Gupta has resulted in the recognition of the work of AROH Foundation nationally as well as internationally and the important milestone includes – the Mahatma Gandhi Award by Liveweek group in New York, Best Corporate Social Responsibility Professional Award in Livelihood, Best Community Award for Global Sustainability, Best NGO Award for Community Development, Asia Pacific International Award, Corporate Social Responsibility Leader of the Year Award, etc.

Media links

Video links 
Dr Neelam Gupta in conversation with Srishti Sharma    कोविड-19 आरोह फाउंडेशन भी कर रहा है असहाय और जरुरतमंद लोगों की सहायता. Sanskar TV

References

External links 
Aroh Foundation Official Website
Aroh Foundation
A Ray of Hope 

Foundations based in India
Organisations based in Noida
Charities based in India
Development charities based in India
2001 establishments in Uttar Pradesh
Organizations established in 2001